

The Bayandor class comprises four Iranian patrol frigates originally built for the US Navy as the PF-103 class. Only two are currently in service. Two were sunk in 1980 by Iraqi Exocet ASM and aerial bombs.

These corvettes were built in Texas under the MAP (Mutual Assistance Programme), wherein ships were built from US Navy funding and transferred immediately upon completion to allied navies. Two half-sisters serve in the Royal Thai navy.

As delivered, they were equipped with depth charge racks and Mk6 K-Guns aft; and a Mk10 Hedgehog forward. These were removed during the Iran-Iraq War. A ZU-23 anti-aircraft gun was added in 1982; this in turn was replaced by an Oerlikon 20 mm gun in 1990.

On 11 June 2013, after a 20-month refit and overhaul Iran's navy launched the corvette Bayandor, the program included repairing of the main engines, overhaul of the heat converters and fuel systems, modernizing of the monitoring systems and installation of  new FCS and radar, and adding a Fajr-27 76 mm dual purpose Oto Melara type rapid fire cannon, and a dual 40 mm anti-aircraft cannon, in addition to two double canister Noor anti-ship missile launchers.

Ships in the class

See also
 , sister vessels in service of Royal Thai Navy
 , similar vessels in service of Indonesian Navy

References

External links
Profile at GlobalSecurity.org

Corvette classes
Ship classes of the Islamic Republic of Iran Navy